Faisal Al-Harshani (born 11 January 1966) is a Kuwaiti fencer. He competed in the team foil event at the 1988 Summer Olympics.

References

External links
 

1966 births
Living people
Kuwaiti male foil fencers
Olympic fencers of Kuwait
Fencers at the 1988 Summer Olympics